Javed Iqbal Warraich is a Pakistani politician who had been a member of the National Assembly of Pakistan from August 2018 till January 2023. Previously he was a member of the National Assembly from 2008 to 2013.

Political career
He was elected to the National Assembly of Pakistan from Constituency NA-196 (Rahim Yar Khan-V) as a candidate of Pakistan Peoples Party (PPP) in 2008 Pakistani general election. He received 52,090 votes and defeated Mian Imtiaz Ahmed.

He ran for the seat of the National Assembly from Constituency NA-196 (Rahim Yar Khan-V) as an independent candidate in 2013 Pakistani general election but was unsuccessful. He received 867 votes and lost the seat to Mian Imtiaz Ahmed.

He was re-elected to the National Assembly as a candidate of Pakistan Tehreek-e-Insaf (PTI) from Constituency NA-179 (Rahim Yar Khan-V) in 2018 Pakistani general election.

See also
 List of members of the 15th National Assembly of Pakistan

References

External links
 

Living people
Pakistani MNAs 2008–2013
Pakistani MNAs 2018–2023
Year of birth missing (living people)